Mount Augustus was a mountain on the West Coast of New Zealand.

It was the locality for a type specimen of the Powelliphanta augusta species of carnivorous snails previously known as Powelliphanta "Augustus". The mountain, part of the Stockton mine, was removed to recover the underlying coal.

References

Buller District
Aug